The Arlington Theatre is 
a historic movie theatre in Santa Barbara, California, United States. Combining the Mission Revival and Spanish Colonial Revival styles of architecture, it the largest movie theater and principal performing arts venue the city. In addition to regular screenings and artists, it is home to many events associated with the annual Santa Barbara International Film Festival.

History 
The Arlington was built at 1317 State Street, on the former site of the Arlington Hotel, which was destroyed following the 1925 Santa Barbara earthquake. The current structure was erected in 1930 as a showcase movie house for Fox West Coast Theaters. It was restored and expanded in the mid-1970s by Metropolitan Theaters Corporation, reopening its doors in 1976.

Architecture 

The Arlington was designed in the Mission Revival and Spanish Colonial Revival styles in a period when Santa Barbara was being rebuilt in that style following a powerful earthquake in 1925. It was designed by the Santa Barbara architectural firm of Edwards and Plunkett, which was formed in 1925 by William A. Edwards and Joseph J. Plunkett and dissolved in 1940 when Edwards left to take a government job.

The exterior has a Mission Revival steeple that ends in an art deco finial. The red tiled building features a covered courtyard with fountain and a free-standing ticket booth.

The interior is elaborately decorated. The ceilings of the lobbies are heavily beamed and painted.  The auditorium itself seats 2,018 on the main floor and balcony.

It is built to give theatergoers the impression that they are sitting outside in the plaza of a colonial Spanish town, each wall features houses, staircases, and balconies, not painted on but built out from the walls.

The proscenium, in the original theater, was formed by what appeared to be a large stone arc, through which could be seen a river and hills (these were painted on the curtain.)  Today, this effect is gone, and the proscenium is topped by the equipment necessary for lighting stage shows.  The original ceiling remains to give patrons the impression that they are sitting outdoors under the stars.

One of the Arlington's signature features is a Robert Morton pipe organ from the Loew's Jersey Theatre that was installed in 1949. Hidden below the orchestra floor, the organ's console rises on a platform into view when played at a performance.

References

External links

The Arlington Theatre - Venue Official Website
Santa Barbara Film Festival - Main page features photo illustration of the Arlington marquee.

Cinemas and movie theaters in California
Tourist attractions in Santa Barbara, California
Music venues in California
Concert halls in California
Spanish Colonial Revival architecture in California
Mission Revival architecture in California
Buildings and structures in Santa Barbara, California
Event venues established in 1931